If You Want to Defeat Your Enemy Sing His Song is the third album by The Icicle Works. The album was released in 1987.

In 2011, Cherry Red Records issued a 3-CD expanded edition of If You Want to Defeat Your Enemy Sing His Song.  Disc 1 featured the original album in its entirety, disc 2 featured a wealth of related demos, b-sides, and remixes, and disc 3 featured a complete live concert entitled Live At The Town And Country Club, 1986.

Track listing

Original release
LP version
All songs written by Ian McNabb.

"Hope Springs Eternal" - 4:06
"Travelling Chest" - 4:40
"Sweet Thursday" - 4:17
"Up Here in the North of England" - 5:12
"Who Do You Want for Your Love?" - 3:54
"When You Were Mine" - 4:37
"Evangeline" - 4:05
"Truck Driver's Lament" - 5:18
"Understanding Jane" - 3:21
"Walking With a Mountain" - 4:44

CD version
The original CD version contained four bonus tracks:  "Everybody Loves to Play the Fool", "I Never Saw My Hometown 'Til I Went Around the World", "Into the Mystic" and "Don't Let It Rain on My Parade".

All songs written by Ian McNabb, except "Into the Mystic" written by Van Morrison.

"Hope Springs Eternal" - 4:06
"Travelling Chest" - 4:40
"Sweet Thursday" - 4:17
"Up Here in the North of England" - 5:12
"Who Do You Want for Your Love?" - 3:54
"Everybody Loves to Play the Fool" - 4:08
"When You Were Mine" - 4:37
"Don't Let It Rain on My Parade" - 4:35
"Evangeline" - 4:05
"Truck Driver's Lament" - 5:18
"Understanding Jane" - 3:21
"I Never Saw My Hometown 'Til I Went Around the World" - 2:48
"Walking With a Mountain" - 4:44
"Into the Mystic" - 3:40

2011 expanded edition
Disc 1 follows the same track listing as the 10-track LP version of this album.

Personnel
 Robert Ian "Boots" McNabb - guitar, vocals, keyboards, harmonica
 Chris Layhe - bass, vocals, keyboards
 Chris Sharrock - drums, percussion

with:

 Dave Green - keyboards
 Mike Timmoney - keyboards
 Ritchie Close - keyboards
 Ian Broudie - keyboards; guitar solo on "When You Were Mine"
 Alison Limerick - backing vocal on "Evangeline"

References

1987 albums
The Icicle Works albums
Albums produced by Ian Broudie
Beggars Banquet Records albums